

th

tha
thalidomide (INN)
Thalitone 
Thalomid 
Tham

the
thebacon (INN)
Theelin 
thenalidine (INN)
thenium closilate (INN)
thenyldiamine (INN)
Theo-24 
Theo-Dur 
Theo-Organidin
Theo-Sav
Theo-X
Theobid 
Theochron 
Theoclear 
Theocon
theodrenaline (INN)
Theolair 
Theolate
Theolixir 
Theomar GG
Theophyl 
theophylline ephedrine (INN)
Theostat 80
Theovent 
Therabid
Theracim
TheraCys
Theraloc
Thermazene

thi

thia-thih
thiacetarsamide sodium (INN)
thialbarbital (INN)
thiamazole (INN)
thiambutosine (INN)
Thiamilate
thiamine (INN)
thiamphenicol (INN)
thiazinamium metilsulfate (INN)
thiazosulfone (INN)
thiethylperazine (INN)
thihexinol methylbromide (INN)

thio-thir
thioacetazone (INN)
thiocolchicoside (INN)
thiofuradene (INN)
Thioguanine (BAN) (GlaxoSmithKline)
thiohexamide (INN)
Thiola
thiomersal (INN)
thiopental sodium (INN)
Thioplex 
Thioplex (Immunex Corporation) 
thiopropazate (INN)
thioproperazine (INN)
thioridazine (INN)
Thiosulfil 
Thiotepa 
thiotepa (INN)
thiotetrabarbital (INN)
thiram (INN)

tho-thy
thonzylamine (INN)
Thorazine
thrombin alfa (USAN) 
thrombin, bovine (INN)
Thrombostat
thrombomodulin alfa (INN)
thymalfasin (INN)
thymocartin (INN)
thymoctonan (INN)
thymopentin (INN)
thymostimulin (INN)
thymotrinan (INN)
Thypinone 
Thyrar
Thyrel TRH 
Thyro-Block 
Thyro-Tabs 
Thyrogen 
thyroglobulin (INN)
Thyrolar 
thyropropic acid (INN)
Thyrosafe 
thyrotrophin (INN)
Thytropar